Holochlora biloba is a species of bush crickets or katydids endemic to Madagascar and the Mascarene archipelago.

References

biloba
Insects of Madagascar
Insects described in 1874